UGC 9405 (also known as PGC 52142) is a faint dwarf irregular galaxy situated in the constellation of Ursa Major. It is about 20.5 million light-years, or 6.3 megaparsecs, away from the Earth. It is listed as a member of the M101 Group, a group containing the several galaxies orbiting the largest, Pinwheel Galaxy (M101). However, due to its far distance from the Pinwheel Galaxy, its membership of the group is uncertain.

References 

9405
Irregular galaxies
Ursa Major (constellation)
M101 Group